Franz Mayer (1882–1975) was a German-born Mexican financier and art collector.

Franz Mayer may also refer to:

 August Franz Josef Karl Mayer (1787–1865), German anatomist and physiologist
 Franz Mayer & Co., 19th century Munich stained-glass artist and manufacturer
 Franz Mayer Museum, museum in Mexico City